Martin Browne is an Irish Sinn Féin politician who has been a Teachta Dála (TD) for the Tipperary constituency since the 2020 general election. Browne is the Chairman of the Oireachtas Joint Committee on Public Petitions. A native of Cashel, he was elected as a member of Tipperary County Council in 2014 for the Cashel—Tipperary local electoral area, serving for 5 years before losing his seat.

Political career

Browne was first elected to a political position in the 2014 Tipperary County Council election, finishing in second place in the Cashel-Tipperary municipal district with 11% of the first preference vote. He lost that seat at the 2019 Tipperary council election, dropping to eighth place and losing his seat to another Sinn Féin candidate, Tony Black.  

At the 2020 Irish general election Browne became a Teachta Dála for Tipperary in an election in which Sinn Féin performed much better than previously expected.

In December 2020, Browne received political backlash after social media posts made during his time as a county councillor received national attention. Browne has previously used his social media to share a  conspiracy theory that the September 11th attacks had been staged using holograms, as well as sharing a post in which Fidel Castro compared NATO to the Nazi SS and accused the USA and Israel of "creating" ISIS and another post in which he questioned reports that Syrian president Bashar al-Assad had used chemical weapons on his own people. Browne issued an apology for the posts, saying he should never have shared them and that they "did not reflect his views".    

In July 2021 Browne faced criticism after he refused to condemn the 1996 killing of Garda Detective Jerry McCabe by members of the Provisional IRA, despite the fact that Sinn Féin leader Mary Lou McDonald unequivocally condemned it days previously.

Personal life
He is married to Helen, and they have four children and six grandchildren. His brother Michael was Mayor of Cashel, and met with Elizabeth II on her visit to Ireland in 2011.

References

Year of birth missing (living people)
Living people
Local councillors in County Tipperary
Members of the 33rd Dáil
Sinn Féin TDs (post-1923)